The  is a type of 2-8-4 wheel arrangement steam locomotive built by the Japanese National Railways (JNR) in 1950 and 1951. They were designed by Hideo Shima and rebuilt at Hamamatsu Works between 1950 and 1951 . 

20 Class D62s were rebuilt from the earlier Class D52, which had a 2-8-2 wheel arrangement.

List of locomotives

D62 1 rebuilt from D52 358 (March 1st 1950)
D62 2 rebuilt from D52 448 (March 2nd 1950)
D62 3 rebuilt from D52 401 (April  3rd 1950)
D62 4 rebuilt from D52 450 (May  4th 1950)
D62 5 rebuilt from D52 449 (June 5th 1950)
D62 6 rebuilt from D52 42  (July 6th 1950)
D62 7 rebuilt from D52 344 (August  7th 1950)
D62 8 rebuilt from D52 366 (September 19th) 1950
D62 9 rebuilt from D52 94 (October 1st-20th 1950)
D62 10 rebuilt from D52 132 (November 3rd-30th 1950)
D62 11 rebuilt from D52 337 (January 1st-5th 1951)
D62 12 rebuilt from D52 397 (January 6th-15th 1951)
D62 13 rebuilt from D52 211 (January 19th-23rd 1951)
D62 14 rebuilt from D52 334 (February 1st-8th 1951)
D62 15 rebuilt from D52 377 (February 12th-19th 1951)
D62 16 rebuilt from D52 338 (February 25th-March 1st 1951)
D62 17 rebuilt from D52 343 (March 2rd-March 6th 1951)
D62 18 rebuilt from D52 360 (March 15th-March 20th 1951)
D62 19 rebuilt from D52 339 (March 21st-March 24th 1951)
D62 20 rebuilt from D52 462 (March 25th-31st 1951)

Preservation
No examples of the class have been preserved.

In popular culture
The D62 is the model upon which the Transformers character Astrotrain is based.

See also
 Japan Railways locomotive numbering and classification

References

Steam locomotives of Japan
1067 mm gauge locomotives of Japan
2-8-4 locomotives
Railway locomotives introduced in 1950
1′D2′ h2 locomotives
Rebuilt locomotives 
Scrapped locomotives
Freight locomotives